The 2008 FIVB Volleyball World League was the 19th edition of the annual men's international volleyball tournament, played by 16 countries from 13 June to 27 July 2008. The Final Round was held in Rio de Janeiro, Brazil.

Pools composition

Intercontinental round
The Final Round hosts Brazil, the winners of each pool and a wild card chosen by the FIVB will qualify for the Final Round. If Brazil are ranked first in Pool A, the team ranked second of Pool A will qualify for the Final Round.

Pool A

|}

|}

Pool B

|}

|}

Pool C

|}

|}

Pool D

|}

|}

Final round
Venue:  Ginásio do Maracanãzinho, Rio de Janeiro, Brazil
All times are Brasília Time (UTC−03:00).

Pool play

Pool E

|}

|}

Pool F

|}

|}

Final four

Semifinals

|}

3rd place match

|}

Final

|}

Final standing

Awards

Most Valuable Player
  Lloy Ball
Best Scorer
  Ivan Miljković
Best Spiker
  Dante Amaral
Best Blocker
  Marko Podraščanin

Best Server
  Gilberto Godoy Filho
Best Setter
  Lloy Ball
Best Libero
  Richard Lambourne

External links
Official website

FIVB Volleyball World League
FIVB World League
Volleyball